Mauro Mendes Ferreira (born 12 April 1964) is a Brazilian politician. He is the former mayor of Cuiabá and is the governor of Mato Grosso, having been elected in the 2018 election. He is a member of Brazil Union.

References

|-

1964 births
Living people
People from Anápolis
Governors of Mato Grosso

Brazil Union politicians
Brazilian Socialist Party politicians
Democrats (Brazil) politicians
Liberal Party (Brazil, 2006) politicians